Maulana Shaheed Ahmed is a Pakistani Islamic scholar and politician who has twice been a member of the National Assembly of Pakistan from 30 November 1988 to 6 August 1990 and 15 October 1993 to 5 November 1996.

References

Living people
Pakistani Islamic religious leaders
Jamiat Ulema-e-Islam (F) politicians
Muttahida Majlis-e-Amal MNAs
Pakistani MNAs 1988–1990
Pakistani MNAs 1993–1996
People from Mardan District
Year of birth missing (living people)